Relations between Canada and the European Union (EU) and its forerunners date back to the 1950s. While the relationship is primarily an economic one, there are also matters of political cooperation. Canadians also use English and French — both European languages — as official and majority languages.

Two overseas territories of EU members (Greenland and Saint Pierre and Miquelon) lie adjacent to Canadian territorial waters.

History

Canada's relationship with Europe is a result of the historical connections generated by colonialism and mass European immigration to Canada. In the Middle Ages, Canada was first colonized by Vikings on the shores of Baffin Island, plus those of Newfoundland and Labrador. However, centuries later in the Modern Age, it would be mainly colonized by France and, after 1763, it formally joined the British Empire after its conquest in the Seven Years' War. In addition, it also had colonial influence from Spain in British Columbia, plus southern Alberta and Saskatchewan.

The United Kingdom has extremely close relations with Canada, due to its British colonial past, and both being realms of the Commonwealth. However, the United Kingdom ceased to be a European Union member state on 31 January 2020. Historically, Canada's relations with the UK and USA were usually given priority over relations with continental Europe.  Nevertheless, Canada had existing ties with European countries through the Western alliance during the Second World War, the United Nations, and NATO before the creation of the European Economic Community.

Agreements
The history of Canada's relations with the EU is best documented in a series of economic agreements:

In 1976, the European Economic Community (EEC) and Canada signed a Framework Agreement on Economic Co-operation, the first formal agreement of its kind between the EEC and an industrialized third country. Also in 1976 the Delegation of the European Commission to Canada opened in Ottawa.

In 1990, European and Canadian leaders adopted a Declaration on Transatlantic Relations, extending the scope of their contacts and establishing regular meetings at Summit and Ministerial level.

In 1996, a new Political Declaration on EU-Canada Relations was made at the Ottawa Summit, adopting a joint Action Plan identifying additional specific areas for co-operation.

Areas of conflict
There is an ongoing tension over the EU ban on the import of seal products.  This was thought to be motivating factor in Canada's efforts to block the EU's efforts to join the Arctic Council.

Canada has also had bilateral territorial disputes with EU member states (see: Turbot War, Hans Island/Territorial claims in the Arctic, and Canada–France Maritime Boundary Case).

Canada–EU Free Trade Agreement

Since as early as June 2007, the Government of Canada led by Prime Minister Stephen Harper had been pressuring the EU and its member countries to negotiate a Canada-EU free trade agreement Former French prime minister Edouard Balladur supported the idea, while former Canadian trade negotiator Michael Hart called the idea "silly."
The Canada Europe Roundtable for Business (CERT), founded in 1999, had been a principal advocate for a free trade agreement supported by more than 100 Canadian and European chief executives. CERT was co-chaired by former Canadian trade minister Roy MacLaren and former editor of The Economist magazine Bill Emmott.

In June 2009, EU Trade Commissioner Catherine Ashton and Canadian Minister of International Trade Stockwell Day released a joint statement regarding the start of negotiations for a Comprehensive Economic and Trade Agreement (CETA).
Minister Day stated "This first meeting represents a solid step toward a historic economic agreement between Canada and Europe. These negotiations are a priority for our government."

Canada and the EU remained at odds over an EU ban on importing seal products and Canada's visa requirement for the EU citizens of the EU member states of Romania and Bulgaria.

CETA has been provisionally applied since September 2017. See the article Comprehensive Economic and Trade Agreement for details of compromises made.

Potential EU membership
Since 2005, several European editorialists have considered that Canada could join the European Union (EU). Proponents argue that, unlike the rest of countries of the Americas, the cultural and political values of Canadians and Europeans have much in common, and that Canadian membership would strengthen both sides politically and economically. While conceding that Canada, located in Northern America, and Europe are over  distant, being separated by the North Atlantic, proponents note that the EU already has a member outside Europe, Cyprus, that is geographically in Western Asia. In addition, Canada is the closest American sovereign country to the European continent, specifically to Northern Europe. This could become much more relevant if Greenland joined the European Union again. The EU and Canada enjoy a very close and friendly strategic partnership. The Delegation of the EU to Canada, in close cooperation with the missions of EU countries, promotes European culture year-round through a number of well-established public diplomacy activities. These events have been effective in increasing the knowledge and understanding of the EU and its relations with Canada. In 2019, Canada was proposed to join the EU's Horizon Europe scientific research initiative. Furthermore, Canada is a member of the Council of the European Space Agency.

In addition, CETA is possibly the farthest-reaching FTA between the EU and a third country. Because of the nature of CETA, some have said that it wouldn't be that far of a leap to EU membership. There have not been any polls conducted on the opinions of Europeans or Canadians regarding closer relations and EU membership. Canadian provinces of Quebec, Ontario, and New Brunswick would help to strengthen the Francophone bloc in the EU together with France, Belgium, and Luxembourg (EU membership may also help to curb separatist sentiments in Quebec). Canada can also bring an Anglophone bloc to the EU after Brexit. In addition, it may decrease Canadian dependence on the United States regarding trade and security. It would also easily meet the Copenhagen Criteria for EU membership. Additionally, the EU is Canada's second-largest trading partner. Canadian and EU officials have not yet commented on this. Recently, the constant trade disputes with China and between the North American countries, plus the social impact of the COVID-19 pandemic, have opened a debate about the possibility of Canada's membership to the EU.

Comparison

Canada's foreign relations with EU member states

See also

 Comprehensive Economic and Trade Agreement
 Delegation of the European Commission to Canada (Ottawa)
 Foreign relations of Canada
 Foreign relations of the European Union
 List of Canadian ambassadors to the European Union
 Mission of Canada to the European Union (Brussels)
 Australia–European Union relations
 Canada–Russia relations
 European Union–NATO relations

References

External links
 Delegation of the European Commission to Canada
 The EU's relations with Canada
 Mission of Canada to the European Union
 Canada - EU:  Negotiations Towards a Comprehensive Economic Partnership Agreement
 Resource for information on EU-Canada Relations from University of British Columbia
 Trade information between EU and Canada, Animated infographic, European Parliamentary Research Service

 
Foreign relations of Canada
Contemplated enlargements of the European Union
Third-country relations of the European Union